Giovanni Degni (28 September 1900 – 2 November 1975) was an Italian football midfielder and manager from Rome. He was born in Rome. He spent the largest majority of his playing career in his home town, appearing for Alba and eventually A.S. Roma in their formative seasons.

After his playing career ended, he went on to management; spending some time at Catania and Roma once more.

Honours
Alba
Italian Football Championship runners-up: 1924–25, 1925–26

References

1900 births
1975 deaths
Italian footballers
Association football midfielders
Serie A players
A.S. Roma players
U.S. Lecce players
Catania S.S.D. players
Italian football managers
A.S. Roma managers
Catania S.S.D. managers
S.S. Alba-Audace Roma players